Kiwaia lenis is a moth in the family Gelechiidae. It was described by Philpott in 1929. It is found in New Zealand.

The wingspan is 13–14 mm. The forewings are grey with a much darker costal area extending from the base to beyond half, reaching to the plical fold and attenuated to the apex. There is a dull ochreous suffusion commencing in the fold near the base and expanding in the disc, with the area beneath the fold whitish. There is a black dash along the fold to about one-sixth, dilated apically. There are two or three black spots following this above the fold and some scattered blackish scales towards the apex. The hindwings are silvery white.

References

Kiwaia
Moths described in 1929
Moths of New Zealand
Endemic fauna of New Zealand
Endemic moths of New Zealand